Eduardo Barrios was a Chilean writer and poet born in Valparaíso on October 25, 1884 and died in Santiago on September 13, 1963.

Overview 

After his father's death, at the age of 5 his family moved to Lima until the age of 15.  After high school he joined the Chilean Military School but quit before graduating as an officer.  He spent much of his young adulthood travelling throughout Latin America doing a colorful array of jobs to earn a living.  By 1915 he was back in Chile working for a variety of newspapers and magazines, including La Mañana, Zig Zag, revista Pacifico and revista Atenea.  From 1925 to 1959 he held various positions in government, museums and the local Press.  He was elected to the Chilean, Argentinian and the Brazilian Academy of Writers.  He obtained the Chilean National Prize for Literature in 1946.

Bibliography 
 Del natural, cuento, 1907
 Mercedes en el tiempo, teatro, 1910
 Lo que niega la vida y por el decoro, teatro, 1913
 El niño que enloqueció de amor, novela, 1915
 Vivir, teatro, 1916
 Un Perdido, novela, 1917
 Papá y mamá, cuento, 1920
 El Hermano Asno, novela, 1922
 Páginas de un pobre diablo, cuento, 1923
 Y la vida sigue, novela, 1925
 Tamarugal, novela 1944
 Teatro escogido, 1947
 Gran Señor y Rajadiablos, novela, 1948
 Los Hombres del Hombre, 1950

References

Further reading
 Davison, Ned J. (1971). Eduardo Barrios. Twayne Publishing

External links
  escritores.cl

1884 births
1963 deaths
Chilean male writers
National Prize for Literature (Chile) winners
Chilean expatriates in Peru